Itikial (also Itikyala) is a small town in Karimnagar district, Telangana, India.

As of the 2001 Indian census, Itikyall had a population of 12,400. Males constitute 48% of the population and females 52%. Itikial has an average literacy rate of 63%, higher than the national average of 59.5%. Male literacy is 75%, and female literacy is 51%.

References

Villages in Karimnagar district